Oh What a Knight is an American animated short film directed by Walt Disney and Ub Iwerks, and released in 1928 by Universal Pictures.  The film features Oswald the Lucky Rabbit trying to save his girlfriend Ortensia from her strict father, Pete, using unusual fighting skills, including him using his own shadow.

This short cartoon shows Oswald's distinct personality, inspired by Douglas Fairbanks, for his courageous and adventurous attitude.

Plot
In the Middle Ages, Oswald, a minstrel, rides his horse while singing and playing a concertina. He reaches a stone tower in which Pete is keeping his daughter Ortensia captive. He scales the tower and he kisses Ortensia. Pete appears carrying a spear. Oswald grabs a sword and they fight. Pete breaks through a wall and gets stuck, allowing Oswald to free Ortensia from the large iron ball to which she is chained. Pete gets free and calls nine knights to help him. Oswald rolls the iron ball toward them like a bowling ball and scatters them. Escaping by the door, they discover a hostile lion, so they leap from the tower using her dress as a parachute and kiss each other as they fall off.

Home media
The short was released on December 11, 2007, on Walt Disney Treasures: The Adventures of Oswald the Lucky Rabbit and Epic Mickey, a platform video game for the Wii console.

References

External links
 

1928 comedy films
1928 films
1928 animated films
American black-and-white films
Oswald the Lucky Rabbit cartoons
American silent short films
Films directed by Walt Disney
Films directed by Ub Iwerks
1920s Disney animated short films
Universal Pictures short films
Universal Pictures animated short films
Animated films about bears
Animated films about cats
Animated films without speech
Films set in the Middle Ages
1920s American films
Silent American comedy films